Rectal administration uses the rectum as a route of administration for medication and other fluids, which are absorbed by the rectum's blood vessels, and flow into the body's circulatory system, which distributes the drug to the body's organs and bodily systems.

A drug that is administered rectally will in general (depending on the drug) have a faster onset, higher bioavailability, shorter peak, and shorter duration than oral administration. Another advantage of administering a drug rectally, is that it tends to produce less nausea compared to the oral route and prevents any amount of the drug from being lost due to emesis (vomiting). In addition, the rectal route bypasses around two-thirds of the first-pass metabolism as the rectum's venous drainage is two-thirds systemic (middle and inferior rectal vein) and one-third hepatic portal system (superior rectal vein). This means the drug will reach the circulatory system with significantly less alteration and in greater concentrations. Finally, rectal administration can allow patients to remain in the home setting when the oral route is compromised. Unlike intravenous lines, which usually need to be placed in an inpatient environment and require special formulation of sterile medications, a specialized rectal catheter can be placed by a clinician, such as a hospice nurse or home health nurse, in the home. Many oral forms of medications can be crushed and suspended in water to be given via a rectal catheter.

The rectal route of administration is useful for patients with any digestive tract motility problem, such as dysphagia, ileus, or bowel obstruction, that would interfere with the progression of the medication through the tract. This often includes patients near the end of life (an estimated 1.65 million people are in hospice care in the US each year). Because using the rectal route enables a rapid, safe, and lower cost alternative to administration of medications, it may also facilitate the care of patients in long-term care or palliative care, or as an alternative to intravenous or subcutaneous medication delivery in other instances.

Methods
Rectal administration of medication may be performed with any of the following:
A suppository, a solid drug delivery system inserted into the rectum where dissolves or melts to exert local or systemic effects.
A micro-enema, a small amount (usually less than 10 millilitres) of a liquid-drug solution injected into the rectum.
A large volume enema to inject liquid into the colon either to cleanse feces from as much of the colon as possible or to deliver a drug solution.
A specialized catheter designed for rectal administration of medications and liquids, that can be placed safely and remain comfortably in the rectum for repeated use.

See also

Enema
Rectal discharge
Routes of administration
Suppository

Notes

References

External links

Routes of administration
Rectum